Laura Pillay Zelia has been a Judge of the Supreme Court of Seychelles since 31 March 2017.

She graduated with a degree in Law from the University of East Anglia in 2001 and a Postgraduate Diploma in Legal Practice from the School of Law in Guildford.

References

Year of birth missing (living people)
Living people
Alumni of the University of East Anglia
Seychellois judges
21st-century judges
21st-century women judges